Beyond CMOS refers to the possible future digital logic technologies beyond the CMOS scaling limits which limits device density and speeds due to heating effects.

Beyond CMOS is the name of one of the 7 focus groups in ITRS 2.0 (2013) and in its successor, the International Roadmap for Devices and Systems.

CPUs using CMOS were released from 1986 (e.g. 12 MHz Intel 80386). As CMOS transistor dimensions were shrunk the clock speeds also increased. Since about 2004 CMOS CPU clock speeds have leveled off at about 3.5 GHz.

CMOS devices sizes continue to shrink – see Intel tick–tock and ITRS :
 22 nanometer Ivy Bridge in 2012
 first 14 nanometer processors shipped in Q4 2014.
 In May 2015, Samsung Electronics showed a 300 mm wafer of 10 nanometer FinFET chips.

It is not yet clear if CMOS transistors will still work below 3 nm. See 3 nanometer.

Comparisons of technology
About 2010 the Nanoelectronic Research Initiative (NRI) studied various circuits in various technologies.

Nikonov benchmarked (theoretically) many technologies in 2012, and updated it in 2014. The 2014 benchmarking included 11 electronic, 8 spintronic, 3 orbitronic, 2 ferroelectric, and 1 straintronics technology.

The 2015 ITRS 2.0 report included a detailed chapter on Beyond CMOS, covering RAM and logic gates.

Some areas of investigation
 tunnel junction devices, eg Tunnel field-effect transistor
 indium antimonide transistors
 carbon nanotube FET, eg CNT Tunnel field-effect transistor
 graphene nanoribbons
 molecular electronics
 spintronics — many variants
 future low-energy electronics technologies, ultra-low dissipation conduction paths, including
topological materials
exciton superfluids
 photonics and optical computing
 superconducting computing
 rapid single-flux quantum (RSFQ)

Superconducting computing and RSFQ

Superconducting computing includes several beyond-CMOS technologies that use superconducting devices, namely Josephson junctions, for electronic signals processing and computing. One variant called rapid single-flux quantum (RSFQ) logic was considered promising by the NSA in a 2005 technology survey despite the drawback that available superconductors require cryogenic temperatures. More energy-efficient superconducting logic variants have been developed since 2005 and are being considered for use in large scale computing.

See also
 International Technology Roadmap for Semiconductors
 International Roadmap for Devices and Systems
 Moore's law
 MOSFET scaling
 Nanostrain, a project to characterise piezoelectric materials for low power switches
 S-PULSE, the EU Shrink-Path of Ultra-Low Power Superconducting Electronics initiative
 Probabilistic complementary metal-oxide semiconductor (PCMOS)

References

Further reading

External links
 ITRS 2013 edition
 EMERGING RESEARCH DEVICES SUMMARY
 Process Integration, Devices and structures summary

Electronic design
Digital electronics
Logic families
Integrated circuits